Valgreghentino is a comune (municipality) in the Province of Lecco in the Italian region Lombardy, located about  northeast of Milan and about  south of Lecco.

Valgreghentino borders the following municipalities: Airuno, Colle Brianza, Galbiate, Olginate.

Twin towns — sister cities
Valgreghentino is twinned with:

  Saint-Rémy-en-Rollat, France

References

External links
 Official website

Cities and towns in Lombardy